The National Organisation for Women’s Shelters and Young Women's Shelters in Sweden (ROKS) is an umbrella organization for around hundred women's shelters in Sweden. It was founded in 1984, and is known for its radical feminist and separatist ideological position. The organization actively participates in public debate in its area. In 2005, the Swedish documentary The Gender War led to significant discussion of ROKS and its ideology, and resulted in its then-chair Ireen von Wachenfeldt leaving her position after stating that "men are animals."

References

Women's shelters
Women's organizations based in Sweden